Jetske van den Elsen (De Bilt, 1 September 1972) is a Dutch female television presenter.

At the age of four, she moved to Nieuwegein and followed her education there. After that, she went to the HKU-theatre school in Utrecht. She has taught at the theatre school, and directed musicals on primary schools and she worked as a journalist for Stadsomroep Utrecht (municipal broadcasting organisation).

Television 
 Vakantie TV (SBS 6)
 De draad kwijt (RTL 4)
 Het Klokhuis (NPS)
 Willem Wever (NCRV)
 BUYA (NCRV)
 Missie Kilimanjaro (NCRV)
 Zomersproeten (NCRV)
 De BZT-Show (NCRV)
 De Rijdende Rechter (NCRV)
 Bijna Beroemd (NCRV)
 Korte lontjes (NCRV)
 Spoorloos (KRO/NCRV)

References 

1972 births
Living people
Dutch television presenters
Dutch women television presenters
People from De Bilt
20th-century Dutch women
21st-century Dutch women